"Say Something" is the debut single by English recording artist Karen Harding. The song was released in the United Kingdom as a digital download on 1 February 2015 through Method Records. The song was written by Karen Harding and Uzoechi Emenike who also produced the song. The song peaked at number 7 on the UK Singles Chart.

Music video
A music video to accompany the release of "Say Something" was first released onto YouTube on 30 September 2014 at a total length of three minutes and thirty-eight seconds.

Track listing

Charts

Weekly charts

Year-end charts

Certifications

Release history

References

2014 songs
2015 debut singles
Karen Harding songs
Songs written by MNEK